Albert Engström (1869 – 1940) was a Swedish artist, author and member of the Swedish Academy from 1922.

Author and Artist
Engström was born in Lönneberga, Kalmar County (Småland) but spent most of his childhood in Hult (near Eksjö), where his father was the railroad stationmaster. He graduated from Norrköping secondary school in 1888 and went to Uppsala University the following year to read Latin and Greek, a pursuit which he abandoned after two years. In 1892 he enrolled at the Valand School of Fine Arts in Gothenburg to study under Carl Larsson.

Between 1894 and 1896 Albert Engström was on the editorial staff for the satirical publication Söndags-Nisse. In 1897 he founded the humor magazine Strix. Among the themes of his many illustrations were those of tramps and drunkards, and indeed alcohol, or rather its adverse effects, featured largely in his humour. One such recurring fictional character was Kolingen.

In a book of autobiographical sketches the author Evert Taube described Engström: "He had a peculiar face with eyes like a bird of Minerva beneath a lofty forehead and bangs . . . a tough but sensitively chiseled nose and faunlike mouth surrounded by a scraggly French goatee — in short, a face that so captivated Swedes that all were compelled to look over to where he sat.  He moved as softly and quietly as a bear and had the lanky appearance of a sailor from Småland. One began thinking of shipwrecks and sleigh rides when he entered a room. But he brought to mind other things as well. He could smile just like Velázquez’s god of wine and roar with laughter like a roustabout . . ."

Engström coined the word "Grönköping" in 1895 as a caption for some of his drawings, thereby inventing the fictional Swedish town of the same name.
In 2002 the CD Grönköping Tar Ton was issued in Sweden to commemorate one hundred years of Grönköpings Veckoblad (Grönköping's Weekly), a satirical monthly magazine that was founded in 1902. The album, depicting Grönköping in recordings made between 1908 and 1946, is available through iTunes.

Several of Albert Engström’s stories have been translated into English and appeared in books and magazines published in England and the United States.

Translations
 
Charles Wharton Stork 
Charles XII, Hercules and Gustav Mattson

E. Sprigge and C. Napier 
The Grey Seal
Osarkrak
A Jest of Janson’s
Swedish Panopticon

Harold Borland  
Politeness
The Journey to Stockholm of Mrs. Holm, the Dean’s Wife
The Power of the Press
Whitsun
Söderbom
The Funeral Hat
When I was Czar
A Bookworm
A Ghost Story
An Uppsala Memory
Causerie
The Unkind Author

Edith T. Aney and Sven O. Karell    
Aidesimos of Aleppo
Moose
The Mystery of the Three Hundred Cans

References

External links

Swedish
Albert Engström at the National Library of Sweden.
Albert Engström at Open Library.
Albert Engström at Project Runeberg.
Albert Engström at the Stockholm Archive. 
Mitt Lif Och Lefverne at the Internet Archive.
English
As Swedish writer sees us
The European Mark Twain
A leading Swedish cartoonist
Unhealthy galoshes
Short Stories
 Lambiek Comiclopedia article.

Illustrations
Grönköping CD cover
Grönköping Veckoblad
Card game in Grönköping 
Humorous stories 1905
Lyrics by Albert Engström
Den blå färgen 01 (The color blue) 
Den blå färgen 02
En visa om kärlekens besvärlighet (Love's difficulty): text
En visa om kärlekens besvärlighet: recitation 
En visa om kärlekens besvärlighet: song
Låt glaset stå (Don't raise the glass) 
Rallarevisa (Railroad worker song): text 
Rallarevisa: song  
Song dedicated to Albert Engström
Svarta Rudolf (Black Rudolph): text 
Black-haired Rudolph: translation
Svarta Rudolf: recording  

1869 births
1940 deaths
People from Hultsfred Municipality
Members of the Swedish Academy
Swedish cartoonists
Swedish editorial cartoonists
Swedish humorists
Swedish comedy writers
Swedish illustrators
Swedish journalists
Swedish comics artists
Swedish songwriters
Swedish-language writers
Writers from Småland